Lochranza Castle is an L-plan fortified tower house situated on a promontory in Lochranza, on the northern part of the Isle of Arran in Scotland. Most of the current structure was built in the 16th century.

History
The castle dates from the 13th century when it was owned by the MacSweens. In 1262, King Alexander III granted the castle and its lands to Walter Stewart, the Earl of Menteith. It is believed that Robert the Bruce landed at Lochranza in 1306 on his return from Ireland to claim the Scottish throne. By 1371, the castle was the property of Robert II. It is thought that at this time it was used as a royal hunting lodge.

During the 1490s, James IV used the castle in his campaign against the Lord of the Isles and the Clan MacDonald.

In 1600 Robert Montgomerie of Skelmorlie recovered the castle for the Marquess of Hamilton from Alastair Mc Alastair and his followers.

In 1614 it was occupied by the king and in the 1650s it was used by Oliver Cromwell.

By 1705, Lochranza Castle was the property of the Hamilton family, after it was purchased by the Duchess of Hamilton. The Hamiltons had owned other estates on the Isle of Arran so eventually sold it to the Blackwood-Davidson family who used it as their principal seat. During the 18th century, the castle fell into disuse and was abandoned. The castle is now in the care of Historic Scotland.

In popular culture
Lochranza Castle was the model for the castle in The Adventures of Tintin comic The Black Island, for the English translation in the 1960s when the drawings were modernised. Bob de Moor, Hergé's chief post-war assistant toured Britain following in Tintin's footsteps, using various locations to produce a series of background drawings. The castle appeared in "Dom Joly and the Black Island" on Channel 4 TV on 19 March 2010, in which it was portrayed as being Kisimul Castle on the Isle of Barra in the Outer Hebrides, as it appeared directly after Joly was shown attempting to reach Kisimul Castle.

Notes

External links

Castles in North Ayrshire
Historic Scotland properties in North Ayrshire
Scheduled Ancient Monuments in North Ayrshire
Isle of Arran
Hunting lodges in Scotland